Abderrahim Harouchi (31 January 194421 August 2011) was a Moroccan pediatric surgeon and politician who served as minister of public health from 1992 to 1995 and Minister of Social Development, Family and Solidarity from 2004 to 2006.

Biography 
Harouchi was born on 31 January 1944 in Casablanca. He got his baccalauréat at Lycée Moulay Hassan in Casablanca in 1961. In 1969, he was received as an Internat des Hôpitaux in UFR Bobigny at Université Sorbonne Paris Nord. He received his Doctorate of medicine from Paris Descartes University in 1972. After that, he received an Agrégation in pediatric surgery in 1975 at Paris Descartes University's faculté de médecine Cochin Port-Royal.

From 1973 to 1975, he worked as chef de clinique at Necker–Enfants Malades Hospital in Paris. From 1976 to 1998, he held the post of Chef de Service de Chirurgie Familiale at the children's hospital in Casablanca. In 1978, he was appointed as professor of pediatric surgery at the Faculty of Medicine of Casablanca, a post he held until 1998. From 1983 to 1986, he worked as a chief physician in the children's hospital of Casablanca. From 1986 to 1992, he worked as the Dean of the Faculty of Medicine of Casablanca.

On 11 August 1992, he was nominated by Hassan II as Minister of Public Health, a post he held until 31 January 1995. On 8 June 2004, he was appointed by Mohammed VI as Minister of Social Development, Family and Solidarity, a post he held until 2006.

He died Sunday 21 August 2011 after a long battle with cancer.

Works 

 Chirurgie pédiatrique, priorités diagnostiques et thérapeutiques (Editions Maghrébines, Casablanca, 1982),
 50 réflexes fondamentaux en chirurgie-pédiatrique (1983)
 Guide de l’évaluation au cours des études médicales (1987)
 Chirurgie pédiatrique en pratique quotidienne (Editions Alinéa, Casablanca, 1989).

Honours 

  Grand Cross of the Order of Civil Merit (2005)

References 

1944 births
2011 deaths
Deaths from cancer in Morocco
Grand Cross of the Order of Civil Merit
Health ministers of Morocco
Moroccan surgeons
Pediatric surgeons
People from Casablanca
Paris Descartes University alumni
Academic staff of the University of Hassan II Casablanca